Elk Creek Wildlife Management Area is located on  east of Wylo in Logan and Mingo counties, West Virginia.  The wildlife management area was established in 2008 on land leased by the West Virginia Division of Natural Resources from Heartwood Forestland Fund II, L.P.

See also
Animal conservation
Fishing
Hunting
List of West Virginia wildlife management areas

References

External links
West Virginia DNR District 5 Wildlife Management Areas

Wildlife management areas of West Virginia
Protected areas of Logan County, West Virginia
Protected areas of Mingo County, West Virginia
Protected areas established in 2008
2008 establishments in West Virginia